Sir Montagu Sharpe KBE DL (28 October 1857 – 23 August 1942) was an English politician, lawyer, amateur archaeologist, antiquarian, and ornithologist. He came from an old Middlesex family that owned  Hanwell Park. He was a member of the Middlesex County Council from its founding in 1889 and a justice of the peace for Middlesex. He was knighted in 1922 and also became a Deputy Lord Lieutenant of Middlesex. Sharpe served as chairman of the Royal Society for the Protection of Birds from 1896 to 1942. He was very active in the introduction of the Importation of Plumage (Prohibition) Bill and involved in framing initial drafts, see Plume hunting.

Sharpe was born at Hanwell to Lt Cmdr Benjamin Sharpe of the Royal Navy and his wife Marianne Fanny Montagu. Marianne was the daughter of the Rev. Montague of Swaffam, Norfolk. Sharpe studied law and was called to the bar, Gray's Inn, in 1889. Sharpe wrote a local history, Middlesex in British, Roman and Saxon Times (1919), in which he suggested that the Roman system of centuriation could be seen in the layout of old manors, but his idea was viewed skeptically by other historians of the period. Later studies have pointed out that his evidence was weak.

Sharpe was a Freemason, serving as Grand Deacon of the United Grand Lodge of England.  He was the founder of Haven Lodge in Ealing, Horsa Dun Lodge in Middlesex and Hanwell Lodge, Ealing.

References

External links 
Middlesex in British, Roman, and Saxon times (1919)

Deputy Lieutenants of Middlesex
Members of Middlesex County Council